The Missouri Bar is the official bar association for all Missouri lawyers and judges. Every licensed Missouri lawyer is automatically a member of The Missouri Bar. Every applicant for admission to the bar must meet a list of requirements set by the Supreme Court of Missouri. To become a Missouri lawyer, a person must have completed an approved law school leading to a juris doctor degree. Additionally, they must pass a comprehensive bar examination and character and fitness investigation and make application for admission to the bar with the Supreme Court of Missouri.

The Missouri Bar was created in 1944 by order of the Supreme Court of Missouri. Its mission is to improve the legal profession, the administration of justice and the law on behalf of the public. Through educational programs, publications, and more, The Missouri Bar serves as a valuable resource for members—and for the citizens of Missouri.

Lawyers participate in the bar in a variety of ways. They may seek to serve as members of the Board of Governors or the Young Lawyers’ Section Council; take part in the more than 30 substantive law committees; volunteer for service projects; choose to attend any of the hundreds of Continuing Legal Education programs produced by the bar each year; attend events, such as the Annual Meeting or MOSolo and Small Firm Conference; or volunteer to write articles for bar publications.

Resources for lawyers include continuing education opportunities, publications, access to research systems, and management advice. All lawyers who practice in Missouri belong to The Missouri Bar.

Members of the public may  find an attorney online, or download one of our 25-plus publications on topics ranging from family law to living wills. We also offer workshops and publications for teachers.

The Missouri Bar's main offices are located in downtown Jefferson City. The Center houses conference rooms and meeting areas, which are available to members for business functions.

All policies and programs of The Missouri Bar are either developed or overseen by the bar's Board of Governors, a 45-member group of elected lawyers who represent the members in their districts.

History 
The Missouri Bar traces its lineage to a voluntary membership organization called the Missouri Bar Association founded in 1880. On June 16, 1944, The Missouri Bar was created by order of the Supreme Court of Missouri with the belief that lawyers are stronger when working together. From its start, The Missouri Bar has worked to improve the profession, the law and the administration of justice for all Missourians, with Supreme Court of Missouri Rule 4 stating that it is the "responsibility of the members of the Bar of this Court and of all lawyers who practice in the State of Missouri" to "strive at all times to uphold the honor and maintain the dignity of the profession and to improve not only the law but the administration of justice."

Structure
Bar policy is set by a board consisting of the organization's officers plus board members elected by district. The officers of The Missouri Bar consist of the President, the President-Elect, the vice-president, and the Immediate Past President. They, along with one representative from each of the three Missouri Court of Appeals districts, make up the organization's executive committee. All members of the executive committee are members of the Board of Governors of The Missouri Bar, the policy-making body elected by the members of the state bar.

Missouri lawyers must complete 15 continuing education credits each year. At least three of the total 15 credit hours must be devoted exclusively to accredited ethics programs, seminars, and activities, including professionalism, substance abuse, mental health, legal or judicial ethics, malpractice prevention, explicit or implicit bias, diversity, inclusion, or cultural competency; and at least one of the three ethics credit hours must be devoted exclusively to explicit or implicit bias, diversity, inclusion, or cultural competency.

References

American state bar associations
Government of Missouri
Missouri law
1945 establishments in Missouri
Organizations established in 1945